Miltochrista cardinalis is a moth of the family Erebidae. It was described by George Hampson in 1900. It is found in the Indian states of Sikkim and Assam.

References

 

cardinalis
Moths described in 1900
Moths of Asia